"" ("No, instead!") is a pop song by Italian singer Laura Pausini for her album, released on October 22, 2008. Its Spanish version, "", featured in the Mexican telenovela  (2008), was nominated for the 2009 Latin Grammy for Record of the Year. The song also has a Portuguese version named "" ("Not now"), but it was released only in Italy.

Lyrics
The song was written by Pausini and Niccoló Agliari and was produced by Pausini and Paolo Carta, her guitarist. The death of Laura's grandmother was the inspiration for the song.

It talks about a longing for a person. The music talks about things that were not said and old memories.

Music video
The music video was filmed in Santa Monica and in West Hills, California in August 2008. Directed by Alessandro D'Alatri and starring former contestant on Survivor: Cook Island Oscar Lusth and fashion model Krystal Davidsohn, the video shows how difficult it is for a soldier to return to every day life.

It was released on the web on 22 October 2008.

Formats and track listings
CDS - Invece no
 Invece no

CDS - En cambio no
 En cambio no (Spanish version)

CDS - Primavera in anticipo (It Is My Song)
Primavera in anticipo (It Is My Song) (duetto with James Blunt)
Primavera in anticipo
Invece no

Digital download
 Invece no
 En cambio no
 Agora não (Portuguese version)

Charts

References

2008 singles
Italian-language songs
Spanish-language songs
Laura Pausini songs
Pop ballads
Telenovela theme songs
Songs written by Laura Pausini
2008 songs
Songs written by Niccolò Agliardi
Atlantic Records singles